Lobophyllia hemprichii, commonly called lobed brain coral, lobed cactus coral or largebrain root coral, is a species of large polyp stony coral in the family Lobophylliidae. It is found in the Indo-Pacific Ocean. In its specific name Christian Gottfried Ehrenberg honoured his late partner the Prussian naturalist Wilhelm Hemprich; they were among the first to study the marine life of the Red Sea.

Description
Several adjacent colonies, sometimes of different colours, may grow together to form a composite colony. The corralites (skeletal cups) may be phaceloid (having a tubular form and growing from a common base) or flabello-meandroid (arranged in valleys with the neighbouring valleys each having a ridge, with the valleys dividing irregularly). Each corallite has a number of septa (vertical blades inside the corallite cup) which taper in thickness and have tall sharp teeth. This coral is some shade of grey, pink, violet or yellowish-brown, sometimes a uniform colour or sometimes with contrasting regions. L. hemprichii is a zooxanthellate coral, having single-celled photosynthesizing organisms known as dinoflagellates living within the tissues. Photosynthesis of these protists provides the coral with nutrients. The thick, fleshy polyps can retract back into the corallite cups in which they sit or extend their tentacles to feed.

Distribution
Lobophyllia hemprichii is native to the tropical and subtropical Indo-Pacific. Its range extends from the Red Sea, the Gulf of Aden and the east coast of Africa through the Indian Ocean and the Bay of Bengal to Japan, Indonesia, New Guinea and Australia. It is found on upper reef slopes, where it is often the dominant species of coral and sometimes the only species.

Status
The International Union for Conservation of Nature lists this species as being of "least concern", on the basis that it has a wide range and is common in most of that range. Although susceptible to bleaching and to other damage caused to corals by a rise in sea temperature and ocean acidification, it is thought to be more resilient than many other species because of its large population size and wide genetic variability. It is collected for the aquarium trade, Indonesia being the main exporter. It is included in CITES Appendix II as are all stony corals.

References

Lobophylliidae
Cnidarians of the Indian Ocean
Cnidarians of the Pacific Ocean
Fauna of the Red Sea
Marine fauna of Africa
Marine fauna of Asia
Marine fauna of Oceania
Marine fauna of Southeast Asia
Marine fauna of Western Asia
Anthozoa of Australia
Corals described in 1834
Taxa named by Christian Gottfried Ehrenberg